Mohammad-Hassan Malekmadani is an Iranian politician who served as the mayor in Isfahan and Tehran.

Mayorship in Tehran 
Malekmadani was elected as Mayor of Tehran by the city council on 25 February 2002, and was approved by the Interior Ministry on 3 March.
He was engaged in a quarrel with the City Council of Tehran before it was dissolved, and accused of corruption, reportedly leading to being sentenced to five months of imprisonment in 2003, however the court exculpated him in 2005.

References

Mayors of Tehran
Mayors of Isfahan
Living people
Executives of Construction Party politicians
1955 births